Parvan Parvanov (born 6 September 1951) is a Bulgarian judoka. He competed in the men's lightweight event at the 1976 Summer Olympics.

References

1951 births
Living people
Bulgarian male judoka
Bulgarian sambo practitioners
Olympic judoka of Bulgaria
Judoka at the 1976 Summer Olympics
Place of birth missing (living people)